Dane Rawlins is a British born dressage rider competing for Ireland. He competed at the 2013 European Championships in Herning and was the founder and dressage show organizer at the All England Jumping Course at Hickstead for 27 years.

References 

Living people
1956 births
Irish male equestrians
Irish dressage riders